Squid Game is a South Korean survival drama series created by Hwang Dong-hyuk for Netflix. The first season of the series features an ensemble cast including Lee Jung-jae, Park Hae-soo, HoYeon Jung, Wi Ha-joon, O Yeong-su, Heo Sung-tae, Anupam Tripathi, and Kim Joo-ryoung.

Overview

Main characters

Seong Gi-hun 

Seong Gi-hun, also known as Player 456, is the main protagonist of Squid Game. He is portrayed by South Korean actor, businessman and model, Lee Jung-jae.

Gi-hun is a gambler down on his luck who gets recruited to play in the Squid Game, a series of deadly childhood games (including "Red Light, Green Light", "Marbles", "Tug of war" and the eponymous Squid game), for a high cash prize, which he ultimately wins. Gi-hun was based on one of the childhood friends of series creator Hwang Dong-hyuk. Gi-hun and Cho Sang-woo were based on Hwang's own personal experiences and represented "two sides" of himself; Gi-hun shared the same aspects of being raised by an economically disadvantaged single mother in the Ssangmun district of Seoul, while Sang-woo reflected on Hwang having attended Seoul National University with high expectations from his family and neighborhood. Hwang said he chose to cast Lee as Gi-hun as to "destroy his charismatic image portrayed in his previous roles".

Born on 31 October 1974, Gi-hun is a resident from the Ssangmun-dong neighbourhood in the city of Seoul, the capital of South Korea. 10 years after losing his job at an automobile manufacturing plant run by Dragon Motors, he is a divorced father, who besides working as a chauffeur, continuously gambles for the purpose of earning money. Living with his diabetic mother, Gi-hun desperately tries to gain custody of his daughter Seong Ga-yeong, who now lives with her mother and stepdad. Trying to be a custodial father, Gi-hun tries taking care of his daughter, but fails due to his lack of money, which he often borrows from the bank as well as from loan sharks. Due to his excessive gambling and other different factors, Gi-hun is millions of won in debt, and constantly evades paying back the money he owes to the bank and loan sharks.

One day after winning 100.000 won playing Ddakji with a salesman, Gi-hun gets invited to the Squid Game, an offer he accepts in hopes of winning a large amount of money, paying back his large debts, paying his mother's hospital bills, gaining back custody of his daughter and overall securing a good life for him and his family. Throughout the game, Gi-hun forms an alliance with Cho Sang-woo, a childhood friend of his, Kang Sae-byeok, a North Korean defector, Ali Abdul (who saved Gi-hun's life during "Red Light, Green Light") and Oh Il-nam, an elderly man. However, due to Cho Sang-woo's willingness to let other players die to further advance in the game, he and Gi-hun become rivals, competing against each other in the final, eponymous squid game. Gi-hun beats Sang-woo in the final game but refuses to kill him, offering him a chance to use the game's third clause to save his friend's life. However, Sang-woo commits suicide by stabbing himself in the neck, allowing Gi-hun to win the competition. As a final request before his death, Sang-woo asks Gi-hun to use some of the prize winnings to help his mother. Gi-hun is heartbroken at Sang-woo's death.

As the winner, Gi-hun receives the prize money and returns to Seoul, but discovers his mother had died and mourns over her body. Gi-hun is left emotionally traumatized from what he went through during the game, living out his old life and not spending any of his winnings. A year later, in December 2021, Gi-hun receives a card from "his gganbu" instructing him to visit a sky tower. Gi-hun comes upon Il-nam, thought to have died in the games, alive but lying in his deathbed, and is horrified and disgusted at Il-nam's revelation that he created the Squid Game. After Gi-hun wins Il-nam's bet regarding a homeless man outside, Il-nam passes away. Following this, Gi-hun dyes his hair red, puts Sae-byeok's brother in the care of Sang-woo's mother and gives her a suitcase containing a large portion of the prize money. Gi-hun then decides to board a flight to Los Angeles to see his daughter but notices the same salesman he originally encountered at the subway playing ddakji with another player. Gi-hun runs to the other side of the platform and takes the invitation card from the player, then calls the number himself, stating that he cannot forgive the organizers for everything they have done. After being told to "just get on that plane", Gi-hun turns around and walks away, presumably to try and take down the game's organizers.

Gi-hun and his portrayal by Lee Jung-jae received critical acclaim. The New York Times named him their breakout star of the year; stating: "As the protagonist Seong Gi-hun, a gambling addict who is deeply in debt, he gives a wrenching and surprisingly subtle performance as he battles his way through unspeakable horrors." For his performance, he was nominated for numerous accolades, including the Critics' Choice Television Award for Best Actor in a Drama Series, the Golden Globe Award for Best Actor – Television Series Drama, and the Screen Actors Guild Award for Outstanding Performance by a Male Actor in a Drama Series, making him the first male actor from Asia and Korea to receive individual nominations in those categories across all three awards shows with his win for the latter and costar HoYeon Jung winning the respective female award making history for the show becoming the first non-English language television series to win at the SAG Awards. He was also nominated along with her costars for the Screen Actors Guild Award for Outstanding Performance by an Ensemble in a Drama Series.

Cho Sang-woo 

Cho Sang-woo, also known as Player 218, is portrayed by Park Hae-soo. Sang-woo is the childhood friend of series protagonist Seong Gi-hun, and a graduate of Seoul National University. While working at an investment firm, Sang-woo stole money from his clients, suffered investment losses, and became millions of won in debt. To solve his financial problems, Sang-woo participated in the Squid Game. Initially allied with Gi-hun and several other players, he takes on a darker role as the series progresses, becoming willing to kill other players to ensure his own survival. Sang-woo was based on one of the childhood friends of series creator Hwang Dong-hyuk. Sang-woo and Gi-hun were based on Hwang's own personal experiences and represented "two sides" of himself; Gi-hun shared the same aspects of being raised by an economically disadvantaged single mother in the Ssangmun district of Seoul, while Sang-woo reflected on Hwang having attended Seoul National University with high expectations from his family and neighborhood.

Sang-woo was childhood friends with Seong Gi-hun. The two friends would often play children's games, such as Squid. Sang-woo later attended Seoul National University, and graduated at the top of his class. According to Gi-hun, Sang-woo's graduation from SNU caused him to become a famous prodigy in the Ssangmun-dong neighbourhood in the city of Seoul, the capital of South Korea. After graduating from SNU, Sang-woo became the leader of an investment team at the securities company Joy Investments. He illegally siphoned money from his client's balances, then invested it in derivatives and future options which failed, resulting in the loss of 6 billion won. He also used his mother's house and store as collateral for his illegal activities. He then gets recruited to play in a series of deadly childhood games, and is re-united with Gi-hun. After learning that participants who lose are killed, Sang-woo gave Gi-hun advise on how to survive "Red Light, Green Light" by informing him that the doll is a motion sensor. After both Sang-woo and Gi-hun survive the game, the majority of players want to quit, horrified at the revelation of players who lose being killed. When the masked staff members repeat the first two consent forms, Sang-woo took the initiative for conducting a vote among the contestants to end the Squid Game. However, he ultimately decided to continue participating when he learned that the prize money for winning was 45.6 billion won. After the games were stopped by the majority vote, his heavy debts almost led him to commit suicide before having been offered the chance to rejoin the Squid Game, which he accepts.

During the Squid Game, Sang-woo helped Gi-hun and others in their alliance, particularly befriending Ali Abdul. However, to ensure his own survival, he became frequently more ruthless and inconsiderate as the game progressed. Sang-woo resorted to manipulation to win the Marbles game, betraying Ali and leaving him to die. He later murdered Player 017 in the Glass Stepping Stones game. After killing Kang Sae-byeok to prevent her and Gi-hun from ending the game, Sang-woo is one of two players to make it into the final round of the competition, along with Gi-hun. The two face off in the eponymous Squid game, in which, after an intense battle between the two, Gi-hun won after Sang-woo was too weak to continue. Before claiming his victory, Gi-hun attempts to end the game by invoking clause 3 of the consent form, hoping to end the game and save his friend's life. However, Sang-woo commits suicide by stabbing himself in the neck, allowing Gi-hun to win the game. As a final request before his death, Sang-woo asks Gi-hun to use some of the prize winnings to help his mother. Sang-woo's request to Gi-hun is fulfilled after he gives a large portion of his winnings to Sang-woo's mother, and also puts Kang Cheol (Sae-byeok's younger brother) in her care, offering both of them a better life.

Park received international fame for his role as Sang-woo, and was able to gain over 800,000 Instagram followers in a single day due to the success of the series.

Kang Sae-byeok 

Kang Sae-byeok, also known as Player 067, is portrayed by model HoYeon Jung in her acting debut. She studied for her role by practicing Hamgyŏng dialect with real North Korean defectors, watching documentaries about North Korean defectors, and learning martial arts. She also drew upon her own feelings of loneliness while modeling overseas to build the character, and wrote a daily diary from Sae-byeok's perspective. Following the release of Squid Game, Sae-byeok became the show's breakout star.

Sae-byeok is a North Korean defector and pickpocket. She originally had grandparents, parents and an older brother, but an epidemic in her native village killed her grandparents and older brother. Her father was shot by the North Korean guards while fleeing the border into China and her mother was captured somewhere in China and repatriated back to North Korea, where she was imprisoned in a prison camp. At one point, Sae-byeok worked for gangster Jang Deok-su but later became independent from him, causing animosity between the two.

Sae-byeok agrees to participate in the Squid Game to raise enough money to help reunite her family and get her younger brother Kang Cheol out of the orphanage. Initially entering the game as a lone wolf, she later allies herself with Seong Gi-hun, who welcomes her on his team despite Sae-byeok pickpocketing him in the past, and his other teammates. She also forms an alliance with Ji-yeong, who sacrifices herself for Sae-byeok during the Marbles game. In the Glass Bridge game, Sae-byeok crosses safely but is impaled by a piece of the exploding glass. Sae-byeok becomes one of the three finalists, alongside Gi-hun and Cho Sang-woo. Before the sixth and final game, Sae-byeok asks Gi-hun to look after her family if she does not make it out of the game alive. Her injury worsens, and she is killed by Sang-woo shortly afterwards to prevent Gi-hun from ending the game to save her life. After winning the game following Sang-woo's suicide, Gi-hun fulfils his promise to Sae-byeok by putting Kang Cheol in the care of Sang-woo's mother.

Jung was called Squid Games breakout star by critics. For her performance, she won the Screen Actors Guild Award for Outstanding Performance by a Female Actor in a Drama Series at the 28th Screen Actors Guild Awards. This nomination made her the second actress of Asian as well as Korean descent to receive an individual SAG Award nomination. Her win, along with Lee Jung-jae winning the respective male award, made history for the show becoming the first non-English language television series to win at the SAG Awards. She was also nominated along with her costars for the Screen Actors Guild Award for Outstanding Performance by an Ensemble in a Drama Series.

Oh Il-nam 

Oh Il-nam, also known as Player 001, is portrayed by O Yeong-su.

Il-nam is initially presented as an elderly man with a brain tumor and dementia, who prefers playing the game to waiting to die in the outside world. During the game, Il-nam forms a close alliance with Gi-hun, and survives the first three games before being seemingly killed off-screen during the Marbles game, voluntarily giving his final marble to Gi-hun for safety.

However, a year after Gi-hun wins the game, it is revealed that Il-nam survived and that he was secretly the creator/host of the games, angering Gi-hun. Il-nam explains his reasoning for creating the games to Gi-hun, namely that he had lost the ability to enjoy life due to his immense wealth and lost faith in humanity, and that he decided to join this game out of boredom, knowing it would be the final one he would oversee. However, he states that he genuinely enjoyed playing the game with Gi-hun. Il-nam then dies of his cancer, but not before making a final bet with Gi-hun.

O Yeong-su won the Golden Globe award for Best Supporting Actor in a TV Series in 2022 for his portrayal of Oh Il-nam.

Hwang Jun-ho 

Hwang Jun-ho is portrayed by Wi Ha-joon.

Jun-ho is a South Korean police detective who, by the beginning of the story, is searching for his missing brother. When Seong Gi-hun (Lee Jung-jae) explains his experience in the first game to the police, Jun-ho is the only one who thinks he is telling the truth. After seeing the same invitation card in his brother's apartment, Jun-ho realises his brother took part in the games, and decides to infiltrate the game, hoping to finally meet his brother. He follows a car transporting players to the ferry to the island the games take place on, and sneaks in undetected by killing a Worker guard and stealing his uniform. He records several events of the game on his phone and also takes pictures, with the intent of sending them to the police at the end of his investigation. Later on, he takes on the role of a Manager and asks Gi-hun if he has heard of a player named In-ho, Gi-hun responds by saying the players do not know each-other's real names.

Later on, Jun-ho kills another guard and searches the Front Man (Lee Byung-hun)'s apartment on the Island, where he finds out that his brother won the Squid Game in 2015. However, the Front Man has already become aware of an intruder on the island, realising he was nearby from the Front Man's phone being placed the wrong way. Jun-ho avoids the Front Man by hiding underneath a table. Jun-ho then disguises himself as a Waiter after the VIPs arrive to watch the fifth game. One of the VIPs (Geoffrey Giuliano) begins flirting with Jun-ho and attempts to force Jun-ho to perform oral sex, but Jun-ho crushes his testicles and forces the VIP to tell him everything he knows about the game, recording the VIP's confession on his phone before knocking him unconscious. At this point, the Front Man and the other staff find out the intruder is a Korean police officer from an ID badge after finding the corpse of the guard Jun-ho killed in the car. Jun-ho also reveals his face to the Front Man for a split second, before continuing to try and escape.

From there, Jun-ho steals diving equipment and attempts to leave the island with the evidence of the games on his phone. Realising the Front Man and some soldiers are going after him, Jun-ho calls one of his co-workers in the police before attempting to send him the evidence. Jun-ho then attempts to escape, but reaches the edge of a cliff, where he is surrounded by several soldiers and the Front Man. Jun-ho informs them of the evidence he took and sent, but the Front Man responds that due to there being no signal, anything he took likely was not sent. He also offers Jun-ho the chance to live if he comes with them and deletes the evidence. Jun-ho refuses, shoots the Front Man in the chest and then asks him who he is. In response, the Front Man takes his mask off, revealing himself to be Hwang In-ho, Jun-ho's brother. In-ho reaches his hand out to Jun-ho, but Jun-ho refuses to come with them. In-ho then aims his gun at Jun-ho, who asks "In-ho.... why?" before being shot by In-ho in the shoulder and falls off the cliff into the water. Afterwards, In-ho is haunted by a vision of his brother in the mirror of his apartment, repeating the "why" question.

Jun-ho's ultimate fate is left ambiguous. Wi and series creator Hwang have stated in interviews that they hope Jun-ho is still alive so the series can further develop the relationship of him and In-ho.

Ali Abdul 

Ali Abdul, also known as Player 199, is portrayed by Anupam Tripathi.

Ali is a Pakistani migrant worker who came to South Korea with his wife and child and participated in the game to win the prize money for his family, especially after he had been cheated out of his earnings by his corrupt boss. Despite his hardship, Ali maintains an optimistic outlook in life and refuses to become bitter. He saves Gi-hun's life during "Red Light, Green Light", and later forms an alliance with him and the other members of Gi-hun's team. Ali survives the first three games, and is killed during Marbles after being betrayed by Sang-woo, who replaces his pouch of marbles with a pouch of pebbles. Ali's death is considered one of the saddest moments in the show, as he had become a fan favorite.

Jang Deok-su 
Jang Deok-su, also known as Player 101, is portrayed by Heo Sung-tae.

Deok-su is a ruthless gangster who entered the game to settle massive gambling debts, having an acrimonious past with Kang Sae-byeok and fallen out of favor with his crime boss. He forms and breaks alliances as needed, becoming the leader of his own faction of players, but believes it is every player for themselves during the competition, even resorting to cheating to win. Deok-su betrays allies such as Han Mi-nyeo, whom he develops a sexual relationship with, and player 278, his right-hand man. He is also directly responsible of the murder of player 271, whom he kills for extra food, after which he realizes riots are allowed during sleeping hours, resulting in the deaths of several other players. Despite his tough demeanor, Deok-su is actually a coward, and when he chickens out during the glass bridge game and refuses to go forward, threatening the lives of all players, Mi-nyeo volunteers to go forward, only to throw him through the glass bridge along with herself to their deaths in revenge for him betraying her and breaking her heart.

Heo Sung-tae, who normally plays villainous characters, gained 900,000 followers on Instagram after playing Jang Deok-su on Squid Game.

Han Mi-nyeo 
Han Mi-nyeo, also known as Player 212, is portrayed by Kim Joo-ryoung.

An eccentric, loud, coarse and manipulative woman, Mi-nyeo is implied to be a con artist, and her reasoning behind joining the game is unknown. She also claims to have had a newborn child who had not been named or registered yet, though that claim is dubious. She quickly learns the ins and outs of the game and keeps her enemies close, initially playing the game selfishly like Jang Deok-su, and allies with whoever will provide her the most protection or benefits. After she helps Deok-su cheat during the Dalgona candy round, the two have sex and she joins his team, but he kicks her out in favor of physically strong male players during the tug of war round. Heartbroken, Mi-nyeo vows to kill him for his betrayal and joins Gi-hun and Sang-woo's team. As a result of not finding a partner for the Marbles game, she does not play that round but is kept alive, much to Deok-su's chagrin. When he chickens out during the glass stepping stones game, Mi-nyeo volunteers to go forward, but uses this as a farce to drag Deok-su and herself to their deaths in order to allow the other players to keep going forward.

Han Mi-nyeo became one of the most polarizing characters in the series, though viewers praised her redemption at the end of her arc. Actress Kim Joo-ryoung, who had previously worked with director Hwang Dong-hyuk on the film Silenced, was personally contacted for the role by Hwang, and stated that working on Squid Game "felt like [she] was dreaming".

Supporting characters

Ji-yeong 
Ji-yeong, also known as Player 240, is portrayed by Lee Yoo-mi. Prior to her joining the games, Ji-young was an ex-convict who was recently released from jail for the murder of her abusive father, who was an alcoholic pastor and the killer of her mother.

During the game, Ji-yeong forms an alliance with Kang Sae-byeok (HoYeon Jung). In the Marbles game, after a conversation about their pasts, Ji-yeong decides to sacrifice herself so Sae-byeok can advance further in the game, believing she has more of a reason to win than her.

Byeong-gi 
Byeong-gi, also known as Player 111 or "The Doctor", is portrayed by Yoo Sung-joo. He is a disgraced doctor who conspires with some of the Masked Men to harvest the organs of deceased or nearly dead players in exchange for extra food and leaked information on the upcoming games. He also joins Jang Deok-su's gang and provides them the information. When the guards fail to get him information, Byeong-gi goes on a rampage and kills a guard in an attempt to escape. As a result, he is killed alongside the guards he worked with by the Front Man, and their bodies are hung for display prior to the Marbles game to make an example out of them for cheating.

The Front Man / Hwang In-ho 

Hwang In-ho, also known as the Front Man, is portrayed by Lee Byung-hun.

In-ho is the brother of Jun-ho, with both men serving in the Korean National Police. In 2015, In-ho took part in the Squid Game that year and won, later returning to the game as a staff member and, by the 2020 games, had become the front man and overseer of the game. During the first game of the 2020 games, In-ho has a drink while watching the game unfold, listening to a cover of "Fly Me to the Moon" play in the background. In the second game, he executes a guard after revealing his mask. Before the fourth game, he shoots another guard and Player 111 (Yoo Sung-joo) for cheating. Around this time, In-ho is alerted of the presence of an intruder, later discovering the intruder is a police officer. He begins  searching for the intruder after noticing that his phone had been placed the wrong way. He searches all the rooms, but is unable to find the intruder, who hid underneath a table.

When the VIPs arrive on the island to watch the fifth game, In-ho informed them that the Host will be unable to watch the game with them, and said that the Host asked him to apologise on his behalf. During the game, the intruder takes the identity of a waiter, who a VIP (Geoffrey Giuliano) begins flirting with, with the intruder requesting the VIP take them somewhere where they can be alone. The VIP does so, taking the intruder back to his room, where he is subsequently held at gunpoint and forced to reveal everything he knows about the game, before being knocked unconscious. After a while, In-ho notices the absence of this VIP, and informs a guard to search for him. The guard finds the VIP unconscious in his room and informs In-ho. Later, during the climax of the fifth game, several of the VIPs begin questioning one of the final four players of the game, who is constantly inspecting the glass panels and claiming to be able tell the difference. Checking the player's report, In-ho tells the VIPs of his backstory as a glassmaker, and makes the game more challenging for him and the other players by turning the lights off.

Immediately after the fifth game's conclusion, In-ho continues his search for the intruder, getting a brief glimpse of him and realising that he is Jun-ho. After Jun-ho steals diving gear and swims away, In-ho and a group of soldiers leave on a boat to try and find him. They eventually find Jun-ho after he is concerned on a cliffside. After Jun-ho informs them of the evidence he took and sent of the game, In-ho reminds Jun-ho of the weak signal on the island and that, although unaware of what exactly Jun-ho took, says that it was likely not sent. He also offers Jun-ho the chance to live if he comes with them and deletes the evidence. Jun-ho refuses, and In-ho is shot in the chest and asked who he is. In response, In-ho takes his mask off, revealing himself to be Jun-ho's brother. In-ho reaches his hand out to Jun-ho, but Jun-ho refuses to come with them. In-ho then aims his gun at Jun-ho, who asks "In-ho.... why?" before being shot by In-ho in the shoulder and falls off the cliff into the water. Afterwards, In-ho is haunted by a vision of his brother in the mirror of his apartment, repeating the "why" question.

When Seong Gi-hun (Lee Jung-jae) wins the game after the voluntary death of Cho Sang-woo (Park Hae-soo), In-ho congratulates GI-hun on his victory and compares the players of the game to horses, and also tells Gi-hun to think of the game like a dream. On December 25, 2021, following the death of Il-nam, In-ho pays his respects and likely takes over his role as the Host. Sometime later, during a phone call with Gi-hun, In-ho tells him to get on the plane for his own good.

The Salesman 
The Salesman is portrayed by Gong Yoo.

He is a former staff member of the game, who has the role of recruiting players. He does so by approaching people who are down on their luck and playing Ddakji with them, offering them 100,000 won if they win but stating he will get the 100,000 won if he wins. However, he gives players the option to play again if they lose, in exchange for being slapped. When a player wins the game, the salesman gives them their winnings, and later offers them a chance to participate in the game by giving them an invitation card with a phone number on the back. If a player decides to accept his offer and rings the number, the salesman tells them if they wish to participate, to state their name and birthdate.

References 

Characters
Lists of drama television characters
Lists of horror television characters
Fictional South Korean people